Dr. Ram Manohar Lohia Avadh University, commonly known as Avadh University or Ayodhya University, is situated on NH330 in Faizabad, Ayodhya in the Indian state of Uttar Pradesh. It was established in 1975 by the government of Uttar Pradesh.

History
The government of Uttar Pradesh, established Avadh University, Ayodhya, initially as an affiliating university by its notification no. 1192/fifteen-10-46(6)-1975 dated 4 March 1975 and appointed Prof. (Dr.) Surendra Singh as the first Vice chancellor. In 1993–94, it was renamed as Dr. Ram Manohar Lohia Avadh University in the memoriam of late Dr. Ram Manohar Lohia, a socio-economic ideologue and freedom fighter.

The university initially started its office in a rental building at Civil Lines, Ayodhya. Land acquisition process for varsity's formal office started in 1976. Ultimately, the then chancellor and governor of the state Shri G.D. Tapase laid foundation of the present administrative building of the varsity on 2 May 1978.

The university assumed the shape of an affiliating cum residential varsity in April 1984. The residential segment became functional with the opening of four PG departments in the campus viz. History, Culture & Archaeology, Economics & Rural Development, Mathematics & Statistics and Physics & Electronics. Four more departments viz. M.B.A, Bio-Chemistry, Microbiology and Environmental Sciences were added to its academic paraphernalia in 1993-94 which in turn brought recognition of the varsity under 12B scheme of U.G.C.

In 2000–01, Institute of Engineering & Technology was established on the campus with B.Tech. (in Mechanical Engineering, Information Technology, Computer Science and Engineering and Electronics & Communication Engineering) and M.C.A. courses. In the same year, some other courses like M.C.J., M.S.W., B.Lib. and M.Lib. were also added to widen the academic spectrum of the residential setup. In addition, a number of PG programs like M.Sc-Biotechnology, M.T.A., M.P.Ed., M.Ed. and UG programs like B.B.A., B.C.A. and B.P.Ed. became functional on the campus from the session 2005–06.

SARDAR PATEL CENTRE FOR NATIONAL INTEGRATION has been established with the vision and mission of creating awareness towards integrating all cross sections of people, culturally and politically. Centre was established in 2020, where in three post-graduate degree programs are successfully running as mentioned in Governance and public policy, Strategic Studies and International Relations.

Campus and infrastructure
The university is spread over an area of 112.24 acres. It has 23 buildings which include the administration building, Kautilya administration building, examination building, Swami Vivekananda auditorium, health centre, central library, entrance examination cell, physics and electronics building, guest house and  IT centre. It has two boys' hostels and faculty housing.

Departments and institutes
 Sardar Patel Centre For National Integration (SPCNI)
 Institute of Engineering and Technology (IET), established in 2000, imparting B.Tech and M.Tech degrees in various engineering areas, as well as MCA.
 Department of Business Management and Entrepreneurship
 Department Of Mass Communication & Journalism (B.Voc Mass communication and MA Mass communication are ug and pg courses running in department)
 Department of Physics and Electronics
 Department of Mathematics and Statistics
 Department of Biochemistry
 Department of Microbiology
 Department of Environmental Sciences
 Department of Economics and Rural Development
 Department of History Culture & Archaeology
 Department of Adult, Continuing and Extension Education
 Department of Master of Social Work
 Department of Physical Education

Affiliated colleges
Avadh University has 134 degree colleges affiliated to it. They fall in the following zones: Ambedkar Nagar, Amethi, Ayodhya, Bahraich, Balrampur, Barabanki, Farrukhabad, Firozabad, Gonda, Lucknow, Pratapgarh, Raebareli, Shravasti, Sultanpur.

Notable alumni

Afroz Ahmad
Anupam Shyam 
Indrajeet Patel
Brij Bhushan Sharan Singh
Jitender Singh Tomar
Sanjay Sinh
Hari Om Pandey
Savitri Bai Phule
Harshit Kushwaha
Lallu Singh
Ram Shiromani Verma 
Shah Alam (filmmaker)
Manish Rawat
Jagdambika Pal
Ameeta Singh
Anupama Jaiswal
Krishna Raj
Deepak Singh (politician)
Vinay Kumar Pandey
Daddan Mishra
Sanghmitra Maurya

References

External links
 
 Dr. RMLAU Admit Card

Universities and colleges in Uttar Pradesh
1975 establishments in Uttar Pradesh
Educational institutions established in 1975
Memorials to Ram Manohar Lohia